The Agreement on the path to normalisation between Kosovo and Serbia is an agreement mediated by the European Union that aims to normalise diplomatic relations between the Republic of Kosovo and the Republic of Serbia. On 27 February 2023, it was verbally accepted by Kosovar prime minister Albin Kurti and Serbian president Aleksandar Vučić and a plan for its implementation was agreed on 18 March 2023.

Background 

In 2008, the Republic of Kosovo unilaterally declared independence from Serbia. Kosovo and Serbia agreed in 2013 to a dialogue facilitated by the European Union (EU), and reaching an agreement with Kosovo is a requirement for Serbia to join the EU.

History 
On 5 December 2022, the European Union sent a draft proposal to both Kosovo and Serbia. On February 27, 2023, Serbian President Aleksandar Vučić and Kosovar Prime Minister Albin Kurti met in Brussels to discuss an agreement, where they accepted the EU's draft. Josep Borrell, EU Foreign Minister, stated that no further discussion was needed regarding the plan itself, and future negotiations would be dedicated to its implementation. Kurti and Vučić met again on 18 March at Ohrid, North Macedonia and verbally accepted a roadmap for implementing the agreement.

Agreement 
While the agreement does not explicitly require that Serbia recognise Kosovo as independent, it does prevent Serbia from opposing the accession of Kosovo to international organisations such as the Council of Europe, European Union or NATO, in addition to requiring Serbia to recognise Kosovar national symbols, passports, diplomas, and vehicle registration plates. Kosovo is required to grant an appropriate level of self-management to its ethnic Serb community. The ultimate goal of the agreement is to create "a legally binding agreement on comprehensive normalisation of [Kosovo–Serbia] relations".

Provisions

The provisions of the agreement include:

The two parties should develop normal, good-neighbourly relations
The parties will mutually recognise their respective documents and national symbols, including passports, diplomas, licence plates, and customs stamps.
Both parties will respect each other's independence, autonomy and territorial integrity and the right of self-determination.
The parties will settle any disputes between them exclusively by peaceful means and refrain from the threat or use of force
Neither of the two can represent the other in the international sphere
Serbia will not object to Kosovo's membership in any international organisation
Neither party will block, nor encourage others to block, the other party's progress in their respective EU path
The government of Kosovo will commit to ensure an appropriate level of self-management for the ethnic Serbian community in Kosovo
Kosovo will ensure the security of the properties of the Serbian Orthodox Church within its borders
Kosovo and Serbia will exchange permanent missions in each other's capitals
Both parties are to continue to implement previous agreements

Implementation
The annex concerning the implementation of the agreement was agreed by the leaders of Kosovo and Serbia on 18 March 2023. A European Union chaired Joint Monitoring Committee is to be formed within 30 days to monitor the implementation of the agreement. The European Union will amend Chapter 35 benchmarks for Serbia to reflect Serbia's new obligations from the agreement and annex. Kosovo's new obligations stemming from the agreement and annex will also be included in its EU ascension process. Both parties accepted that failure to implement the provisions of the agreement will lead to negative consequences both in terms of aid from, and ascension to, the European Union.

Reactions

Kosovo
On 18 March 2023, Kosovar prime minster Albin Kurti stated that by accepting the terms of the agreement Serbia had de facto recognised Kosovo as a state on 27 February 2023. He also added  that in the absence of Vučić physically signing the document, the European Union should ensure it remains legally and internationally binding on the parties. On 20 March 2023, Kurti said during a meeting with foreign diplomats in Pristina, that as a result of the agreement, the road for Kosovo to join the Council of Europe is now open.

Serbia

After signalled his acceptance of the text of the main agreement at the high-level meeting in Brussels on 27 February 2023, Serbian president Aleksandar Vučić appeared to change his position in a TV interview the following evening saying that "there is no agreement" and that "I will not let Kosovo into the UN" after he was accused by far-right and nationalist parties of betraying national interests. After the meeting in Ohrid on 18 March 2023, Vučić stated on live TV the following day that he will work on implementing the agreement so long as he is not required to de jure recognise the independence of Kosovo or support its membership of the United Nations which he described as red lines. He also stated that he doesn't want to sign anything with Kosovo because Serbia does not recognise its independence and said that "I have excruciating pain in my right hand, I can only sign with my right hand and that pain is expected to continue for the next four years".

Organisations
 European Union High Representative for external affairs Josep Borrell described the agreement as a "significant achievement". EU Council president Charles Michel congratulated the parties on reaching an agreement and stated that implementation is key to peace, stability and prosperity in the Western Balkans.
 OSCE chairman in office Bujar Osmani congratulated both parties on reaching an agreement.

Countries

 Albanian Prime Minister Edi Rama welcomed that both Kosovo and Serbia had consented to the terms of the agreement. Rama also hopes that the agreement will lead to an improvement in relations between Serbia and Albania.
 French President Emmanuel Macron has expressed support for the agreement.
 German Chancellor Olaf Scholz welcomed the agreement on 7 March 2023 and said he expected constructive results soon.
 Irish foreign ministry described the agreement as an important step and added that implementation is now key.
 North Macedonian foreign minister and Bujar Osmani congratulated both parties on reaching an agreement.
 The foreign ministry of Norway congratulated Kosovo, Serbia and the EU on reaching an agreement.
 Turkey welcomed the agreement and hopes the parties will comply with its terms.
 The government of Switzerland welcomed the agreement and stated that it is committed to supporting its implementation.
 The United Arab Emirates welcomed the agreement.
 British diplomats in Belgrade and Pristina welcomed the agreement and commended the brave steps taken by the leaders of Kosovo and Serbia in reaching an agreement and urged both sides to move quickly make its provisions a reality.
 The agreement was welcomed by the United States which urged both parties to immediately begin its implementation. The United States Special Envoy for the Western Balkans, Gabriel Escobar, stated that the US considers the agreement to be legally binding on the parties.

See also 
Brussels Agreement (2013)
Kosovo and Serbia economic normalisation agreements

Explanatory notes

References

External links 

 Agreement on the path to normalisation between Kosovo and Serbia at European Union
 Implementation annex at European Union

Kosovo–Serbia relations